Yekkeh Soud-e Olya (also Romanized as Yekkeh So’ud-e ‘Olyā; also known as Yekkeh So’ud-e Bālā and Yekkeh Se’ud) is a village in Jargalan Rural District, Raz and Jargalan District, Bojnord County, North Khorasan Province, Iran. At the 2006 census, its population was 1,657, in 355 families.

References 

Populated places in Bojnord County